Melkus was a marque of single seat racing cars and sport cars founded by the race driver Heinz Melkus in Dresden in East Germany. The company existed from 1959 to 1986, and then from 2009 to 2012. The cars originally used engines from Wartburgs and many of the other parts came from Wartburgs and Trabants. The racing cars competed in Formula 3, Formula Junior and Formula Ford.  The 2009 to 2012 models used engines from Toyota and Volkswagen.

The only road car the company produced from 1959 to 1986 was the Melkus RS 1000. It was a sleek sports car powered by a tuned mid-mounted Wartburg 3-cylinder 2-stroke engine. Most of the cars used the 992 cc version, but some of the later cars had the 1200 cc version. It had gullwing doors. 101 cars were made.

The company stopped making cars in 1986. In the early 1990s, Heinz Melkus and his family started running a BMW dealership in Dresden.

In December 2006, Melkus Engineering--a German company owned by Peter Melkus, son of Heinz Melkus--announced it would re-launch the RS 1000 sports car. A new model, the Melkus RS 2000 was produced from 2009 to 2012. It was originally to be powered by either an Opel or turbocharged  Volkswagen engine.

The new RS 2000 premiered at the Frankfurt International Motor Show in 2009.

The car manufacturing arm of Melkus filed for bankruptcy in August 2012.

Models 

 Melkus JAP Eigenbau (1954)
 Melkus Formel Junior Baureihe (1959/60)
 Melkus Formel Junior Baureihe (1961/62)
 Melkus Formel Junior Baureihe (1963)
 Melkus Formel 3 Baureihe (1964)
 Melkus SRG MT 77
 Melkus PT 73 Spyder
 Melkus Lada ML89
 Melkus BMW MB90
 Melkus Silberpfeil
 Melkus Zigarre
 Melkus RS 1000
 Melkus RS 2000 (2008)
 Melkus RS 2000 GT (2011)
 Melkus RS 2000 GTS (2011)

References

External links 

Company history at RitzSite
 Melkus - Dresden based BMW and Lotus dealer
 Melkus Motorsport
 Wartburg article with Melkus pictures

Car manufacturers of Germany
Sports car manufacturers
Manufacturing companies based in Dresden
Car manufacturers of East Germany
German racecar constructors